Tony Corinda (May 17, 1930 – July 1, 2010) was an English mentalist, inventor and dealer of stage magic goods,  and businessman who wrote the book Thirteen Steps To Mentalism. Corinda did not make his  birthplace public although it is believed he was born in Mill Hill, London.
Born Thomas William Simpson, he took the name Tony Corinda (a variation on the name Conradi) when he began working as a mentalist in the UK. In 1950, he opened a magic studio where he sold all types of magicians' paraphernalia, but catered especially to mentalists. Later, he took over The Magic Shop in  Oxford Street, London which was originally run by Dick Chavel. This store was at street level so catered mainly to the lay public, so many of the items sold were either practical jokes or beginners' tricks, but other items and small illusions for semi-professional magicians and hobbyists were also sold over the counter. Around the same period, Corinda had the magic concession in Hamleys Toy Shop in Regent Street.

He was famed for his extensive collection of ostriches and squids, which he would enthusiastically display to the neighbors.

From 1956 to 1958, Corinda wrote a series of thirteen booklets on mentalism, each one dealing with a different aspect of mentalism or an allied art. The booklets were originally published as 13 individual 'courses'. Compiled as the encyclopedic "Corinda's 'Thirteen Steps to Mentalism'" the series was produced circa 1961 as a hardcover bound volume by Harry Clarke, a printer who produced many other books for magic studios at that time.  Jon Tremaine and Eric Mason did much of the artwork. John Henley 2014 and later published in 1964 as a complete volume by D. Robbins and Co. From then the book went on to be regarded as the essential 'mentalism' reference book.

In 2011 Corinda's Thirteen Steps to Mentalism was republished in the Encyclopedia of Mentalism and Mentalists.  http://www.mysticlightpress.com/index.php?page_id=156 .

The book was later adapted into video format by mentalist and magician, Richard Osterlind.

His inventions are mainly from that book.

He lived out his retirement in Norfolk, England, and died on July 1, 2010.

References

2010 deaths
English magicians
1930 births
Mentalists